Getting Doug With High is a video and audio podcast hosted by American stand-up comedian and actor Doug Benson.

Guests are interviewed while smoking marijuana alongside Benson. Each episode features different strains of sativa and indica, and showcases a series of smoking implements of unusual design, often including pipes designed by Chameleon Glass.

The show features several recurring segments:
 High History—The guests talk about the first time they ever smoked marijuana
 Pot Topics—Doug talks about news related to cannabis, with a particular focus on which states have legalized and/or decriminalized marijuana or are close to passing a legislative or ballot initiative to do so.
 Pot Quiz Hop Shot—Doug asks the guests a series of cannabis-related trivia questions.
 #HeavyMonkey—Doug tries to get one of the guests to comment about the weight of a broken lighter shaped like a monkey. 
 Gabe Time (now canceled)—To close out the show, Doug brings out magician Gabe Dylan to perform a magic trick for the guest, who by this point is usually very high.

In 2016, Benson hosted an uninterrupted four hour and twenty minute version of the show at a festival hosted by Jash in Palm Springs, California. The show has also hosted live versions of the show, with several guests, in front of an audience in a theater.

During the show that aired December 27, 2019, Benson noted that the show would be on hiatus.

Cast

Doug Benson - Host

Frequently appearing
Gabe Dylan
Alicia Glass
Taylor Rizzo

Episodes

References

External links
 

Video podcasts
American comedy web series
2013 podcast debuts
Comedy and humor podcasts